Obârșia may refer to several places in Romania:

Obârșia, a commune in Olt County
Obârșia, a village in Petriș Commune, Arad County
Obârșia, a village in Izvoru Berheciului Commune, Bacău County
Obârșia, a village in Dănciulești Commune, Gorj County
Obârșia, a village in Cernișoara Commune, Vâlcea County
Obârșia (Crușov), tributary of the Crușov in Olt County
Obârșa, tributary of the Crișul Alb in Hunedoara County

See also 
 Obârșeni (disambiguation)